Wheatley Hills Golf Club, is a  country club and golf course in East Williston, New York. It was established in 1913 from land purchased from  William Titus for forty eight dollars per acre. The Titus homestead was converted into the clubhouse. Adjacent to the property is the Long Island Motor Parkway built by William Kissam Vanderbilt II where he held auto races and awarded the Vanderbilt Cup. Also adjacent is the property of Harry Payne Whitney.

References

External links

Golf clubs and courses in New York (state)
1913 establishments in New York (state)